Ngohauvi Lydia Kavetu (born 3 July 1965 in Omao, Kunene Region) is a Namibian politician. A member of the Democratic Turnhalle Alliance, Kavetu has been a member of the National Council of Namibia since 2004. She represents Opuwo Constituency in the Kunene Regional Council and is one of two members of the DTA in the Kunene Council. Following her 2004 election, she was chosen as the DTA's only member of the 3rd National Council. Prior to entering national politics in 2004, Kavetu was a member of the town council of Opuwo from 1998 to 2004.

References

1965 births
Living people
Popular Democratic Movement politicians
Members of the National Council (Namibia)
People from Kunene Region
Women members of the National Council (Namibia)
21st-century Namibian women politicians
21st-century Namibian politicians
20th-century Namibian women politicians
20th-century Namibian politicians